Matzka is a surname. Notable people with the surname include:

Ralf Matzka (born 1989), German cyclist
Scott Matzka (1978–2018), American ice hockey player